In futurology, a singleton is a hypothetical world order in which there is a single decision-making agency at the highest level, capable of exerting effective control over its domain, and permanently preventing both internal and external threats to its supremacy. The term was first defined by Nick Bostrom.

Overview
An artificial general intelligence having undergone an intelligence explosion could form a singleton, as could a world government armed with mind control and social surveillance technologies. A singleton need not directly micromanage everything in its domain; it could allow diverse forms of organization within itself, albeit guaranteed to function within strict parameters. A singleton need not support a civilization, and in fact could obliterate it upon coming to power.

A singleton doesn't necessarily need to be an organisation, government or AI. It could form through all people accepting the same values or goals. These people coming together would form an "agency" in the broad sense of the term according to Bostrom.

A singleton has both potential risks and potential benefits. Notably, a suitable singleton could solve world coordination problems that would not otherwise be solvable, opening up otherwise unavailable developmental trajectories for civilization. For example, Ben Goertzel, an AGI researcher, suggests humans may instead decide to create an "AI Nanny" with "mildly superhuman intelligence and surveillance powers", to protect the human race from existential risks like nanotechnology and to delay the development of other (unfriendly) artificial intelligences until and unless the safety issues are solved. Furthermore, Bostrom suggests that a singleton could hold Darwinian evolutionary pressures in check, preventing agents interested only in reproduction from coming to dominate.

Yet Bostrom also regards the possibility of a stable, repressive, totalitarian global regime as a serious existential risk. The very stability of a singleton makes the installation of a bad singleton especially catastrophic, since the consequences can never be undone. Bryan Caplan writes that "perhaps an eternity of totalitarianism would be worse than extinction".

Similarly Hans Morgenthau stressed that the mechanical development of weapons, transportation, and communication makes "the conquest of the world technically possible, and they make it technically possible to keep the world in that conquered state". Its lack was the reason why great ancient empires, though vast, failed to complete universal conquest of their world and perpetuate the conquest. Now, however, this is possible. Technology undoes both geographic and climatic barriers. "Today no technological obstacle stands in the way of a world-wide empire", as "modern technology makes it possible to extend the control of mind and action to every corner of the globe regardless of geography and season." Morgenthau continued on the technological progress:

See also
 AI takeover
 Existential risk
 Friendly artificial intelligence
 Superintelligence
 Superpower

References

Singularitarianism
Globalism
International relations
Risk analysis
Supranational unions
World government
Global issues
Government by algorithm